German School may refer to:

 German School of Athens
 German School Bucharest (Deutsche Schule Bukarest)
 German School of Guayaquil
 German School Kuala Lumpur
 German School of Lisbon
 German School London
 German School Madrid
 German School of Milan
 German School New York
 German School of San Salvador
 German School Seoul International
 German School Washington, D.C. (DSW)

See also
 German Embassy School (disambiguation)
 German International School (disambiguation)